Paradise Creek can refer to:

 Paradise Creek (Pennsylvania), tributary of Brodhead Creek in the Pocono mountains of the eastern United States
 Paradise Creek, tributary of Lyons River in Western Australia
 Paradise Creek, tributary of Salmond River in the Pentecost River system in Western Australia
 Paradise Creek, tributary of Bow River in Alberta, Canada
 Paradise Creek, tributary of the South Fork of the Palouse River in the northwestern United States
 Paradise Creek (horse), racehorse
 Paradise Creek Brewery, located in the Old Post Office in Pullman, Washington